"Mentiroso" is the first single released internationally by Spanish singer-songwriter Enrique Iglesias from his fourth full-Spanish album, Quizás (2002), It was released on 22 July 2002 (see 2002 in music).

Song information
The track was written by Cheín García-Alonso and Enrique Iglesias. It was released to U.S. radio outlets on 22 July 2002 in two versions, ballad and mariachi, making the first time that any Iglesias single is released with mariachi.

Chart performance
The track debuted on the United States Billboard Hot Latin Tracks chart at number 6 on 10 August 2002, and rose to number 1 six weeks later, spending one week at the summit. The single spent 13 weeks in the top 10.

See also
List of number-one Billboard Hot Latin Tracks of 2002

References

2002 singles
2002 songs
Enrique Iglesias songs
Spanish-language songs
Songs written by Enrique Iglesias
2000s ballads
Pop ballads
Song recordings produced by Lester Mendez
Songs written by Chein García-Alonso